St. Mary's Hospital is a Catholic general hospital located in Montreal, Quebec, Canada. Affiliated with McGill University, St. Mary's is an independent teaching hospital. The hospital is located at 3830 Lacombe Avenue in the borough of Côte-des-Neiges–Notre-Dame-de-Grâce. Serving a very ethnically diverse community, staff members are able to communicate in over 30 different languages. St. Mary's is an integral part of the Réseau universitaire intégré de santé (RUIS) McGill.

History 
St. Mary's Hospital was founded in 1924 by Sister Helen Morrissey and  Dr. Donald A. Hingston. First a 45-bed institution located at Shaughnessy House (now the Canadian Centre for Architecture) in the Shaughnessy Village neighbourhood of Downtown Montreal, it has since moved to its current location in 1934 where it has 271 beds.

References

External links
 St. Mary's Hospital (http://www.smhc.qc.ca/en/)
 St. Mary's Hospital Foundation (http://www.stmaryshospitalfoundation.ca/en/home)
 Addition to St. Mary's Hospital, Montréal, Québec, 1938 (exterior perspective view), John S. Archibald collection, Canadian Centre for Architecture

Hospitals in Montreal
Hospital buildings completed in 1934
Hospitals established in 1924
Christian hospitals
Côte-des-Neiges–Notre-Dame-de-Grâce
1924 establishments in Quebec
McGill University buildings